Provincial Trunk Highway 52 (PTH 52) is a provincial highway in the Canadian province of Manitoba. It runs east from PTH 59, through the city of Steinbach, to La Broquerie where it ends at its junction with PR 210 and PR 302.  It is a two-lane highway, except from Mitchell to the eastern edge of Steinbach, where it is a divided, four-lane road.

The speed limit is 100 km/h (60 mph), except within Steinbach city limits and the community of Mitchell.

Major intersections

External links

Official Manitoba Highway Map

052
Transport in Steinbach, Manitoba